The Subercase River is a tributary of Grasset Lake (watershed of Nottaway River, in the Nord-du-Québec administrative region, in the Canadian province of Quebec, in Canada. The course of the river crosses the townships of Desmazures, Daloigny, La Gauchetière, Saint Hélène, Subercase and Grasset.

Forestry is the main economic activity of the sector. Recreational tourism activities (especially hunting and fishing) come second.

This hydrographic slope has some forest access roads. The surface of the river is usually frozen from early November to mid-May, however, safe ice circulation is generally from mid-November to mid-April.

Geography 
The main neighboring hydrographic slopes are:
 North side: Grasset Lake, Kitchigama River;
 East side: Deux Lacs River, Allard River, Lake Matagami, Soscumica Lake, Nottaway River;
 South side: Samson River, Adam River, Harricana River;
 West side: Samson River, Harricana River.

The "Subercase River" originates from a forest stream located at:
 Southeast of the mouth of the Subercase River;
 Southeast of the mouth of the Kitchigama River;
 Southwest of the mouth of Lake Matagami;
 to Southwest of downtown Matagami.

 northward in Desmazures township, to the limit of Daloigny township;
 northerly forming a westerly curve in the township of Daloigny to the western limit of the township of Desmazures;
 North in Desmazures Township to the southern limit of La Gauchetière township;
 northward in the township of La Gauchetière, to the eastern limit of the township of Saint Hélène;
 northwesterly in the township of Saint-Hélène skirting the Saint-Hélène Hills and crossing the southern portion of Long Lake to the southern limit of Township of Subercase;
 northeasterly in the Township of Subercase across the northern portion of Long Lake to the western boundary of Grasset Township;
 northeasterly in Grasset Township to mouth.

The Subercase River empties onto the South bank of the Nottaway River. This confluence is located at:
 Southeast of the mouth of the Kitchigama River;
 Southeast of the mouth of the Nottaway River (confluence with Rupert Bay);
 West of downtown Matagami, Quebec;
 West of the mouth of Matagami Lake.

Toponymy 
The term "Subercase" is a family name of English origin.

The toponym "Subercase River" was formalized on December 5, 1968, at the Commission de toponymie du Québec, i.e. at the creation of this commission.

References

See also 
James Bay
Rupert Bay
Nottaway River
Kitchigama River
Grasset Lake
List of rivers of Quebec

Rivers of Nord-du-Québec